The Wijnegem Shop Eat Enjoy is a shopping mall in Wijnegem, near Antwerp, Belgium. In 2018, the mall changed its name. The previous name was Wijnegem Shopping Center.

See also 
List of shopping malls in Belgium

References

Shopping malls in Wijnegem
Shopping malls established in 1993